Angel Oquendo is an American film, television and voice-over actor. In addition to his work on film, he's appeared in a number of television series including Mayans MC, 9-1-1:Lone Star, Animal Kingdom and Everybody Hates Chris.

Filmography
Shadowboxer (2005) as Lamar
King of California (2007) as Younger Cop
1408 (2007) as Taxi Cab Driver
Ocean's Thirteen (2007) as Ortega
Vacancy 2: The First Cut (2009) as Deputy #3
Post Grad (2009) as Police Officer
The Misadventures of the Dunderheads (2012) as Panicky Richard
Cars 3 (2017) as Bobby Swift (Uncredited)
Chang Can Dunk (2023) as Coach

TV guest appearances
America's Most Wanted as Hugo Magan in episode Catalino Morales (season 14) February 10, 2001
Hack as Security Guard in episode Collateral Damage (season 2 episode 4) October 18, 2003
The FBI Files playing Ella in episode Still Holding (season 3 episode 20) April 18, 2005
Monk as Garage Attendant in episode Mr. Monk and the Actor (season 5 episode 1) July 7, 2006
What About Brian as Technician in episode What About Second Chances (season 2 episode 1) October 9, 2006
Bones as Nurse in episode The Headless Witch in the Woods (season 2 episode 10) November 29, 2006
ER as Thigh Patient Tell Me No Secrets (season 13 episode 10) November 30, 2006
My Name Is Earl as Prison Medic in episode My Name is Inmate #28301-016, Part 2 (season 3 episode 2) September 27, 2007
Nip/Tuck as Oscar Aureilles in episode Magda and Jeff (season 5 episode 10) January 22, 2008
CSI: Miami as Criminal in episode Head Case (season 7 episode 12) January 12, 2009
Everybody Hates Chris as Miguel in episode Everybody Hates The Car (season 4 episode 18) March 29, 2009
Raising the Bar as Carlos (seasons 1 & 2 multiple episodes) 2008-2009
Fear Clinic as Garcia (season 1) October 27, 2009
House as EMT Coumont in episode Help Me (season 6 episode 22) May 17, 2010
Dexter as FBI Handler in episode Beauty and the Beast (season 5 episode 4) October 17, 2010
The Mentalist as Jorge Velasquez in episode Like a Redheaded Stepchild (season 3 episode 21) May 4, 2011
Law and Order: LA as Eddie Ramos in episode El Sereno (season 1 episode 20) June 20, 2011
Legit as Man in the Aisle Seat in episode Anger (season 1 episode 4) February 7, 2013
Cougar Town as Concierge in episode Have Love Will Travel (season 4 episode 15) April 9, 2013
Enlisted as Angry MP in episode Pilot (season 1 episode 1) January 10, 2014
Major Crimes as David - Ice Cream Vendor in episode Two Options (season 3 episode 7) July 21, 2014
The Baker and the Beauty as MPD Officer 3 in episode Blow Out (season 1 episode 7) May 25, 2020
Dave as Mr. Santos in episode Dave (season 2 episode 10) August 11, 2021
9-1-1: Lone Star as Manuel (season 3, multiple episodes) 2022
Mayans M.C. as Downer (season 4, multiple episodes) 2022
Animal Kingdom as Detective Jenkins in episode 1992 (season 6 episode 1) June 19, 2022

References

External links

Angel Oquendo on TV Guide

Living people
1981 births
American male film actors
American male television actors
American male voice actors
People from the Bronx
Male actors from New York (state)
21st-century American male actors